Minkah Annane Fitzpatrick Jr. (born November 17, 1996) is an American football free safety for the Pittsburgh Steelers of the National Football League (NFL). He played college football at Alabama, and was drafted by the Miami Dolphins in the first round of the 2018 NFL Draft before being traded to the Steelers during the 2019 season.

High school career
Fitzpatrick attended St. Peter's Preparatory School in Jersey City, New Jersey, where he played high school football for the Marauders. He was a wide receiver on offense and a defensive back on defense. In 2014, he caught 45 passes for 1,111 yards and 12 touchdowns, while recording 70 tackles and three interceptions on defense. He also ran track. He placed first at the Hudson County Championships with times of 10.86 seconds and 21.66 seconds in the 100 and 200 meters, respectively.

Recruiting
Considered a five-star recruit by ESPN.com, Fitzpatrick was listed as the No. 4 cornerback in the nation in 2015.

Fitzpatrick signed with Alabama at the 2015 National Signing Day, after being verbally committed for almost a year.

College career
As a true freshman in 2015, Fitzpatrick started 10 of 14 games, missing one game due to injury. He recorded 45 total tackles, with three for a loss, two sacks, two interceptions (both returned for scores), 11 pass breakups, one quarterback hurry, and one punt return for a touchdown. He was part of the Alabama team that won the National Championship over Clemson. He was named a Freshman All-American by The Sporting News after Alabama's championship season.

In his sophomore season in 2016, Fitzpatrick returned an interception 100 yards in a 49–30 win over then-16th ranked Arkansas. The interception broke the Alabama Crimson Tide record for longest interception returned for a touchdown. In that same game, he tied the Alabama records for most interceptions in a game (3), and career interceptions returned for a touchdown (4). In the 2016 SEC Championship Game against Florida, Fitzpatrick broke the Alabama all-time record for career interceptions returned for a touchdown (4).

In his junior season in 2017, Fitzpatrick recorded 60 total tackles, 1.5 sacks, one interception, one forced fumble, and seven passes defensed. He won his second National Championship as the Crimson Tide defeated Georgia 26–23 in overtime.

College statistics

Professional career
On January 11, 2018, Fitzpatrick announced his decision to forgo his remaining eligibility and enter the 2018 NFL Draft. Fitzpatrick attended the NFL Scouting Combine in Indianapolis and completed the majority of combine drills, but opted to skip the short shuttle and three-cone drill. On March 7, 2018, Fitzpatrick participated at Alabama's pro day, but opted to stand on his combine numbers and only performed the short shuttle, three-cone drill, and positional drills.

Fitzpatrick attended pre-draft visits with the Chicago Bears, Tampa Bay Buccaneers, and San Francisco 49ers. His versatility allowed him to possibly play safety or cornerback as a professional, but Fitzpatrick expressed his desire to primarily play cornerback to multiple teams. NFL analyst Mel Kiper Jr. stated Fitzpatrick may experience a slide in the draft due to not having a defined role. At the conclusion of the pre-draft process, Fitzpatrick was projected to be a first round pick by NFL draft experts and scouts. He was expected to be drafted within the top 15 selections. Fitzpatrick was ranked as the top cornerback prospect in the draft by DraftScout.com and was ranked as the top safety prospect by Sports Illustrated and NFL analyst Mike Mayock.

Miami Dolphins
The Miami Dolphins selected Fitzpatrick in the first round with the 11th overall pick in the 2018 NFL Draft. Fitzpatrick was the first safety drafted in 2018.

On June 1, 2018, the Miami Dolphins signed Fitzpatrick to a fully guaranteed four-year, $16.4 million contract that includes a signing bonus of $10.04 million.

2018
During training camp, Fitzpatrick competed against T. J. McDonald to be the starting free safety. He learned both safety positions and primarily ran with the second team. Head coach Adam Gase named Fitzpatrick the primary backup safety to begin the regular season, behind starters McDonald and Reshad Jones.

He made his professional regular season debut in the Dolphins’ season-opener against the Tennessee Titans and recorded six combined tackles and broke up a pass in their 27–20 victory. On September 23, 2018, Fitzpatrick earned his first career start after Jones was declared inactive due to a shoulder injury. He  recorded ten combined tackles (two solo) during their 28–20 victory against the Oakland Raiders in Week 3. The following week, he collected ten combined tackles (four solo), two pass deflections, and made his first career interception in the Dolphins’ 38–7 loss at the New England Patriots. Fitzpatrick made his first career interception off Tom Brady in the fourth quarter on a pass intended for Phillip Dorsett, and returned it for a 14-yard gain. During a Week 15 matchup  with the Minnesota Vikings, Fitzpatrick intercepted a Kirk Cousins pass, returning it 50 yards for a touchdown. It was his second interception and first pick-six of his career.

2019
In Week 1 against the Baltimore Ravens, Fitzpatrick made six tackles as the Dolphins lost 59–10. After the game, Fitzpatrick reportedly requested to be traded because he felt like he was playing out of position and he did not like the direction the franchise was going.
In Week 2 against the New England Patriots, Fitzpatrick made six tackles and recovered a fumble by running back Sony Michel in the 43–0 loss.

Pittsburgh Steelers

On September 16, 2019, the Dolphins traded Fitzpatrick along with their 2020 fourth round and 2021 seventh round draft picks to the Pittsburgh Steelers for their 2020 first round (Austin Jackson), 2020 fifth round, and 2021 sixth round draft picks.
Fitzpatrick made his debut with the Steelers in Week 3 against the San Francisco 49ers.  In the game, Fitzpatrick intercepted a pass from Jimmy Garoppolo and forced a fumble off Raheem Mostert in the 24–20 loss.
In Week 8 against his former team, the Miami Dolphins, Fitzpatrick intercepted former teammate Ryan Fitzpatrick twice in the 27–14 win. In Week 9 against the Indianapolis Colts, Fitzpatrick intercepted a pass thrown by Brian Hoyer and returned it for a 96-yard touchdown in the 26–24 win. Fitzpatrick's pick six was the third longest interception return for a touchdown in team history, the second longest in the regular season. In Week 10 against the Los Angeles Rams, Fitzpatrick recovered a strip sack forced by teammate Javon Hargrave on Jared Goff which he returned for a 43-yard touchdown and later intercepted a pass thrown by Goff with under a minute in the game, sealing a 17–12 Steelers win.
In Week 12 against the Cincinnati Bengals, Fitzpatrick recorded six tackles and recovered a fumble forced by teammate Devin Bush on Tyler Boyd and returned the ball for 36 yards in the 16–10 win.

2020
In Week 6 against the Cleveland Browns, Fitzpatrick recorded his first interception of the season off a pass thrown by Baker Mayfield and returned it 33 yards for a touchdown during the 38–7 win.
In Week 8 against the Baltimore Ravens, Fitzpatrick forced a fumble on quarterback Lamar Jackson which was recovered by teammate Robert Spillane and later broke up a pass thrown by Jackson in the endzone with no time left on the clock to secure a 28–24 Steelers' victory.
In Week 9 against the Dallas Cowboys, Fitzpatrick recovered a fumble forced by teammate Cameron Sutton on CeeDee Lamb, intercepted a pass thrown by Garrett Gilbert and broke up another Hail Mary pass thrown by Gilbert late in the fourth quarter to secure a 24–19 Steelers’ win.
 In Week 11 against the Jacksonville Jaguars, Fitzpatrick recorded two interceptions off passes thrown by quarterback Jake Luton, propelling the Steelers to a 27–3 victory and their first 10–0 start in franchise history.

2021
On April 27, 2021, the Steelers picked up the fifth-year option on Fitzpatrick's contract, worth a guaranteed $10.612 million for the 2022 season. On November 15, 2021, Fitzpatrick tested positive for COVID-19 and was put on the Steelers' Reserve-COVID list.

2022
On June 16, 2022, the Steelers signed Fitzpatrick to a four-year $73.6 million contract extension, including $36 million in guaranteed money. With an annual salary of $18.4 million, he became the highest paid safety in the NFL at the time, later being surpassed by Derwin James of the Los Angeles Chargers.

In week 1 against the Cincinnati Bengals, Fitzpatrick recorded a pick-six off of Joe Burrow and blocked a game-winning extra point off of Evan McPherson as the Steelers would go on to win 23–20 in overtime. His performance earned him AFC Defensive Player Of The Week.

NFL career statistics

Regular season

References

External links

Alabama Crimson Tide bio
Pittsburgh Steelers bio

1996 births
Living people
People from Old Bridge Township, New Jersey
Players of American football from New Jersey
Sportspeople from Middlesex County, New Jersey
St. Peter's Preparatory School alumni
American football defensive backs
Alabama Crimson Tide football players
All-American college football players
Miami Dolphins players
Pittsburgh Steelers players
American Conference Pro Bowl players